Paracanoeing at the 2016 Summer Paralympics, also simply referred to as canoeing, was held in Rio de Janeiro in September 2016, with a maximum of 60 athletes (30 men, 30 women) competing in six sprint style events. This was the first appearance for Para-canoe in the Paralympic Games.

Background to inclusion
In 2009, the International Canoe Federation (ICF) began a programme to make the sport accessible to everyone, with the explicit aim of including it in the Paralympic Games for the first time in Rio.
In 2010, 31 countries sent participants to the ICF Canoe Sprint World Championships in Poland. That same year, the sport’s inclusion in the Rio 2016 Paralympic Games was approved.

In the Paralympic Games, only kayaks, identified by the letter K, are used, and only flatwater sprint events are held. Each boat is adapted according to the functional abilities of its crew members. Athletes with any type of physical-motor disability may participate in competitions.

Classification
The Olympic and Paralympic versions have similar rules, with the fastest canoeist winning. The competition format features direct classification to the finals and repechage heats to decide which athletes will take part in the final race, in which medals are won.

There are three functional classes: L3, where athletes use their legs, trunk and arms to help paddling; L2, in which athletes use only their trunk and arms; and K1, in which athletes only use their arms.
Events are always held along straight line courses marked by buoys, 200 metres long. There are both men’s and women’s races, with events for individuals.

Qualification
An NPC can be allocated a maximum of one qualification slot per medal event. An NPC can obtain a maximum of three male and three female slots. There must be a minimum of three continents represented in each medal event at the Rio 2016 Paralympic Games.

Qualification slots will be allocated as follows:

Medal summary

Medal table

Medalists

References

 
2016
2016 Summer Paralympics events
2016 in canoeing
Canoeing and kayaking competitions in Brazil